Dirk Vanderherten (born 9 March 1957) is a Belgian long-distance runner. He competed in the men's marathon at the 1988 Summer Olympics.

References

External links
 

1957 births
Living people
Athletes (track and field) at the 1988 Summer Olympics
Belgian male long-distance runners
Belgian male marathon runners
Olympic athletes of Belgium
People from Uccle
Sportspeople from Brussels